Helena Bergman ( Jansson, born 28 August 1985) is a Swedish orienteer who became World Champion in the sprint distance in Miskolc, Hungary in 2009. She lives in Stockholm and competes for OK Ravinen. She is married to Gustav Bergman.

Results

World Games
 2017 Gold, Middle distance

World Orienteering Championships
 2011 Silver, Sprint
 2011 Bronze, Long distance
 2011 Gold, Middle distance
 2011 Bronze, Relay
 2010 Silver, Sprint
 2010 Bronze, Relay
 2009 Gold, Sprint
 2009 Silver, Relay
 2008 Bronze, Sprint
 2008 Bronze, Relay
 2007 Silver, Relay
 2007 4th, Sprint
 2007 5th, Middle distance
 2006 9th, Middle distance

European Championships
 2010 Gold, Sprint
 2010 Gold, Relay
 2010 Bronze, Long distance
 2008 Gold, Relay
 2008 Bronze, Sprint

Nordic Championships
 2009 Gold, Middle distance
 2009 Gold, Relay
 2007 Gold, Sprint
 2007 Gold, Relay

Swedish Championships
 2007 Gold, Sprint

Junior World Championships
 2005 Silver 2005 Relay
 2004 Gold, Middle distance
 2004 Gold, Relay
 2003 Silver, Relay
 2003 Bronze, Long distance
 2002 Bronze, Relay

O-Ringen
 2009 1st
 2004 1st
 2003 1st

References

External links
 
 Helena Jansson at World of O Runners
 

1985 births
Living people
Swedish orienteers
Female orienteers
Foot orienteers
World Orienteering Championships medalists
Umeå University alumni
World Games gold medalists
Competitors at the 2017 World Games
Junior World Orienteering Championships medalists